Francisco "Pako" Javier Cruz Saldívar (born October 3, 1989) is a Mexican professional basketball player who last played for Manisa Büyükşehir Belediyespor of the Turkish Basketbol Süper Ligi. He also represents the senior Mexico national basketball team. He played NCAA Division I college basketball at Wyoming. He is a 1.91 m (6'3") tall shooting guard, that can also play as a small forward.

High school
Cruz attended and played basketball at Abraham Lincoln High School, in Denver, Colorado.

College career
After high school, Cruz played college basketball. He first played at Western Nebraska Community College (JUCO), from 2008 to 2010. He then transferred to Wyoming (NCAA Division I), where he played with the Wyoming Cowboys, from 2010 to 2012.

Professional career
Cruz began his pro career with the Mexican League club Halcones Rojos, in 2012. In 2015, he moved the Argentine League club Ciclista Olímpico. He then joined the Latvian club VEF Rīga, with which he played in the VTB United League.

In 2016, he joined the Spanish club Fuenlabrada, of the Liga ACB and European-wide 2nd-tier level EuroCup.

On 3 August 2019, he signed with Rytas Vilnius of the Lithuanian Basketball League.

On August 15, 2020, he has signed with Afyon Belediye of the Turkish Basketbol Süper Ligi.

On June 25, 2021, he has signed with Tofaş of the Basketbol Süper Ligi.

National team career
Cruz is a member of the senior Mexico national basketball team. With Mexico, he played at the 2014 FIBA World Cup, and at the 2015 FIBA Americas Championship. He also played at the 2016 Turin FIBA World Olympic Qualifying Tournament, and at the 2017 FIBA AmeriCup, where he won a bronze medal, and was named to the All-Tournament Team.

References

External links
Twitter 
EuroCup Profile
FIBA Archive Profile
Spanish League Profile 
Eurobasket.com Profile
Wyoming College Bio

1989 births
Living people
2014 FIBA Basketball World Cup players
Afyonkarahisar Belediyespor players
Baloncesto Fuenlabrada players
Basketball players at the 2015 Pan American Games
Basketball players from Sonora
BC Rytas players
BK VEF Rīga players
Ciclista Olímpico players
Competitors at the 2018 Central American and Caribbean Games
Fuerza Guinda de Nogales players
Halcones Rojos Veracruz players
Liga ACB players
Mexican expatriate basketball people in Argentina
Mexican expatriate basketball people in Latvia
Mexican expatriate basketball people in Lithuania
Mexican expatriate basketball people in Spain
Mexican expatriate basketball people in the United States
Mexican men's basketball players
Pan American Games competitors for Mexico
People from Nogales, Sonora
Pioneros de Quintana Roo players
Shooting guards
Small forwards
Tofaş S.K. players
Western Nebraska Cougars men's basketball players
Wyoming Cowboys basketball players